W26EW-D, virtual and UHF digital channel 26, is a low-powered HSN-affiliated television station licensed to Huntington, West Virginia, United States. The signal covers all of Huntington, and also can reach parts of Ashland, Kentucky and Ironton, Ohio.

History

Early years
A construction permit was held by North East LPTV, Inc. to launch a new station on channel 17 with the call letters W17BH. The station signed on the air on February 26, 1992. In an application filed with the FCC on October 28, 2004, ownership of the station changed to Ventana Television while the station was known as W14CU.

Analog-to-digital conversion
W14CU shut down its analog signal over UHF channel 14 sometime in 2011 due to displacement. The station resumed broadcasting in digital as W30DG-D on July 24, 2012 on digital channel 30. Through the use of PSIP, digital television receivers displayed the station's virtual channel as its former UHF analog channel 14.

Spectrum incentive auction results
W30DG-D went silent on June 21, 2019 because it was displaced by WKMR, a KET member station, due to the FCC Spectrum Repack. During this time Ventana Television held a construction permit to move to digital channel 26 but the station was prevented from moving to its new frequency until another KET member station, WKAS, repacked and vacated digital channel 26 on October 26, 2019, at the earliest.

Ventana Television filed for an extended special temporary authorization (STA) to remain silent on December 24, 2019, because work on the tower was incomplete. On June 15, 2020, Ventana amended its extended silent STA request citing the impacts of COVID-19 as a contributing factor. Ventana noted in their request they were unable to get the tower crew to perform the installation of the new antenna due to West Virginia's stay at home order and the backlog of work for tower crews to perform as the state opens up. They expected the station to be operational within six months after the station went silent a year prior.

The station resumed operations and moved to its new channel on July 6, 2020 under the new callsign W26EW-D. W26EW-D no longer uses its old analog number as its virtual number instead using its new digital number as its virtual number. It was also at this time the station's signal become multiplexed.

Digital channels
The station's digital signal is multiplexed:

References

External links

30DG-D
Television channels and stations established in 1990
1990 establishments in West Virginia
Huntington, West Virginia
Low-power television stations in the United States